Beaver Lake is a hamlet in northern Alberta, Canada within Lac La Biche County.

Demographics 

Lac La Biche County's 2016 municipal census counted a population of 527 in Beaver Lake.

See also 
List of communities in Alberta
List of designated places in Alberta
List of hamlets in Alberta

References 

Hamlets in Alberta
Designated places in Alberta
Lac La Biche County